Mikhail Grigorievich Remizov (9 November 1948 – 17 September 2015) was a Russian stage and film actor.

Biography 
In 1973 he graduated from the Moscow Art Theater School (Vasily Markov's course). A year earlier he starred in the television movie Big School-Break, and it was his first role in the cinema.  He served in the Russian Army Theatre, Youth Theatre Krasnoyarsk, Tomsk Drama Theater, the Moscow Literary and Drama Theatre of the WTO and the New Drama Theatre.

Since 1996, he was the actor of the Stanislavsky  Moscow Drama Theater.

Death
He died on the night of September 17, 2015 of a heart attack aged 66.   He was buried at the Vagankovo Cemetery.

Selected filmography
 Big School-Break (1972)
 Seventeen Moments of Spring (1973)
 Life Is Beautiful (1980)
 Muhtar's return (2003)
 Wedding Ring (2008)

References

External links
 
 Biography, ruskino.ru; accessed 30 October 2015. 
 Михаил Ремизов (Mihail Remizov): биография, фильмография, фото  

1948 births
2015 deaths
Russian male film actors
Russian male stage actors
Soviet male film actors
Soviet male stage actors
Male actors from Moscow
20th-century Russian male actors
21st-century Russian male actors
Russian male television actors
Moscow Art Theatre School alumni
Burials at Vagankovo Cemetery